SPCC might refer to:

Educational institutions
 St. Paul's Co-educational College in Hong Kong
 St. Philip's Christian College in Waratah, Australia
 St Peter Claver College in Riverview, Australia
 South Piedmont Community College in the US state of North Carolina

Societies for the Prevention of Cruelty to Children
 National Society for the Prevention of Cruelty to Children
 Irish Society for the Prevention of Cruelty to Children
 Massachusetts Society for the Prevention of Cruelty to Children
 New York Society for the Prevention of Cruelty to Children
 Children 1st, previously known as the Royal Scottish Society for Prevention of Cruelty to Children

Other
 St Pancras Cruising Club, a members' group of canal boat owners in London
 St. Paul Curling Club in St. Paul, Minnesota
 Sex Positive Community Center in Seattle, Washington
 Spill Prevention, Control and Countermeasure, a program of the United States Environmental Protection Agency
 Southern Pacific Communications Company, a component part of the U.S. telecom company CenturyLink
 Cold Rolled Carbon Steel Sheets and Strip, a Japanese industrial standard.